Nillae (nillaes) was an Indian term for a type of blue colored cloth. It was either entirely made of silk or a blend of silk and cotton with a blue striped pattern. Nillaess were produced in a variety of beautiful hues. Midnapore and Balasore both were producing the cloth.

Etymology 
The term is derived from the Hindi word 'Nila,' which means 'blue.'

Quotes

Exports 
In the seventeenth century, Nillaes were among the notable Indian goods exported from Bengal. Records suggest that Samuel Rowland Fisher ordered 15 pieces of Nillaes in 1767 with a price of 17 Shilling per piece.

See also 
 Salu (cloth), a red cloth.

References

Textiles
Woven fabrics